Voicești is a commune located in Vâlcea County, Oltenia, Romania. It is composed of three villages: Tighina, Voicești and Voiceștii din Vale.

References

Communes in Vâlcea County
Localities in Oltenia